Emma Wirkus (born 11 January 1982 in Stirling, South Australia, Australia) is an Australian who currently plays football (soccer) for the Australian W-League team Perth Glory.

References

Australian women's soccer players
Living people
Perth Glory FC (A-League Women) players
1982 births
Australia women's international soccer players
2007 FIFA Women's World Cup players
Women's association football goalkeepers